The Tacoma Police Department (TPD) is the primary law enforcement agency for the city of Tacoma, Washington, United States.  The TPD employs 334 sworn officers and 38 civilian employees. The Chief of Police is Avery L. Moore.

Controversies and misconduct 
On March 3, 2020, Manuel Ellis, a black man, died while in TPD custody. Ellis said "I can't breathe" several times before his death.

In 2021, several people were hit by an officer in a police car, causing multiple injuries. The officer was responding to reports of vehicles doing doughnuts in the street. It was found that the officer acted in defense for himself and there was no wrongdoing as he was being attacked.

References

External links
 Official website
 Roll Call of Honor

Government of Tacoma, Washington
Municipal police departments of Washington (state)
Government agencies established in 1885
1885 establishments in Washington Territory